Publius Egnatius Celer, (lived c. AD 60), was a Stoic philosopher, who as a result of being a delator, or informer, in the reign of Nero, was sentenced to death in the reign of Vespasian.

Treason charges were brought against Barea Soranus in AD 66 because he had incurred the hatred of Nero. Egnatius Celer, who had formerly been a client and the teacher of Barea Soranus, stood as chief witness against him.  Barea Soranus was condemned to death together with his daughter Servilia.

Egnatius received great rewards from Nero, but was afterwards accused by Musonius Rufus, another Stoic philosopher, under Vespasian, and fell out from favor.

References
 Tacitus, Annals, xvi. 30–33.
 Juvenal, Satire iii. 116.
 Dio Cassius, lxii. 26.

Further reading 
 John K. Evans, "The Trial of P. Egnatius Celer", Classical Quarterly, 29 (1979), pp. 198–202

Philosophers of Roman Italy
Executed ancient Roman people
Roman-era Stoic philosophers
1st-century philosophers
1st-century Romans
Celer, Publius
1st-century executions
People executed by the Roman Empire
Year of birth unknown
Ancient Roman delatores